Avraham Sela is an Israeli historian and scholar on the Middle East and international relations. 



Education and Career
Sela studied at the Hebrew University of Jerusalem, gaining a BA in 1971, an MA in 1974 and a PhD in 1986. He currently serves as the A. Ephraim and Shirley Diamond Professor of International Relations and a senior research fellow at the Harry S. Truman Institute, both at the Hebrew University.

He is the author of The Decline of the Arab Israeli Conflict: Middle East Politics and the Quest for Regional Order (1998) and co-author of The Palestinian Hamas: Vision, Violence and Adjustment (2000).

Views
Sela is fairly critical of the writings of the New Historians, particularly of Benny Morris and Avi Shlaim.

Publications
 Unity Within Conflict in the Inter-Arab System: The Arab Summit Conferences, 1964–1982 (Magnes Press, 1983) (Hebrew)
 The Palestinian Ba'ath: The Arab Ba'ath Socialist Party in the West Bank under Jordan (1948–1967) (Magnes Press, 1984) (Hebrew)
 The PLO and Israel: From Armed Struggle to Political Settlement (St. Martin's Press, 1997, editor)
 The Decline of the Arab-Israeli Conflict: Middle East Politics and the Quest for Regional Order (SUNY Press, 1998)
 The Palestinian Hamas: Vision, Violence and Coexistence (New York: Columbia University Press, 2000), 2nd Edition (Columbia University Press, 2006),
 The Continuum Political Encyclopedia of the Middle East (Continuum, 2002).

References 

 Biography at the Faculty Members page of Hebrew University of Jerusalem International Relations department

Israeli political scientists
Year of birth missing (living people)
Living people
Jewish writers
Jewish historians
Academic staff of the Hebrew University of Jerusalem